The rise of nationalism in Europe was stimulated by the French Revolution and the Napoleonic Wars. American political science professor Leon Baradat has argued that “nationalism calls on people to identify with the interests of their national group and to support the creation of a state – a nation-state – to support those interests.” Nationalism was the ideological impetus that, in a few decades, transformed Europe.  Rule by monarchies and foreign control of territory was replaced by self-determination and newly formed national governments. Some countries, such as Germany and Italy were formed by uniting various regional states with a common "national identity". Others, such as Greece, Serbia, Bulgaria, and Poland were formed by uprisings against the Ottoman or Russian Empires. Romania is a special case, formed by the unification of the principalities of Moldavia and Wallachia in 1859 and later gaining independence from the Ottoman Empire in 1878.

Background 

National awakening also grew out of an intellectual reaction to the Enlightenment that emphasized national identity and developed an authentic view of cultural self-expression through nationhood. The key exponent of the modern idea of the nation-state was the German G. W. Friedrich Hegel. The French Revolution, although primarily a republican revolution, initiated a movement toward the modern nation-state and also played a key role in the birth of nationalism across Europe where radical intellectuals were influenced by Napoleon and the Napoleonic Code, an instrument for the political transformation of Europe. "Its twin ideological goals, nationalism and democracy, were given substance and form during the tumultuous events beginning at the end of the eighteenth century." Revolutionary armies carried the slogan of "liberty, equality, brotherhood" and ideas of liberalism and national self-determinism.  He argued that a sense of nationality was the cement that held modern societies together in the age when dynastic and religious allegiance was in decline. In 1815, at the end of the Napoleonic wars, the major powers of Europe met at the Congress of Vienna and tried to restore the old dynastic system as far as possible, ignoring the principle of nationality in favour of "legitimism", the assertion of traditional claims to royal authority. With most of Europe's peoples still loyal to their local province or city, nationalism was confined to small groups of intellectuals and political radicals. Furthermore, political repression, symbolized by the Carlsbad Decrees published in Austria in 1819, pushed nationalist agitation underground.

Pre-1848 revolutions
1789, French Revolution,national assembly. 
1797- Napoleon establishes Sister Republics in Italy
1804–15, Serbian Revolution against the Ottoman Empire
1814, Norwegian independence attempt against Denmark-Norway and future Sweden & Norway, aftermath of the  Napoleonic Wars (including War on independence)
1821–29, Greek War of Independence against the Ottoman Empire
1830,  Croatian national revival
1830–31, Belgian Revolution,  Revolution in Poland and Lithuania
1846, Uprising in Greater Poland

The struggle for independence 
 
A strong resentment of what came to be regarded as foreign rule began to develop. In Ireland, Italy, Belgium, Greece, Poland, Hungary, and Norway local hostility to alien dynastic authority started to take the form of nationalist agitation. The first revolt in the Ottoman Empire to acquire a national character was the Serbian Revolution (1804–17), which was the culmination of Serbian renaissance which had begun in Habsburg territory, in Sremski Karlovci. The eight-year Greek War of Independence (1821–29) against Ottoman rule led to an independent Greek state, although with major political influence of the great powers. The Belgian Revolution (1830–31) led to the recognition of independence from the Netherlands in 1839. Over the next two decades nationalism developed a more powerful voice, spurred by nationalist writers championing the cause of self-determination. The Poles attempted twice to overthrow Russian rule in 1831 and 1863. In 1848, revolutions broke out across Europe, sparked by severe famine and economic crisis and mounting popular demand for political change. In Italy, Giuseppe Mazzini used the opportunity to encourage a war mission: "A people destined to achieve great things for the welfare of humanity must one day or other be constituted a nation".
 
In Hungary, Lajos Kossuth led a national revolt against Habsburg rule; in Transylvania, Avram Iancu led successful revolts in 1846. The 1848 crisis had given nationalism its second full public airing, and in the thirty years that followed no fewer than seven new national states were created in Europe. This was partly the result of the recognition by conservative forces that the old order could not continue in its existing form. Conservative reformers such as Cavour and Bismarck made common cause with liberal political modernizers to create a consensus for the creation of conservative nation-states in Italy and Germany. In the Habsburg monarchy a compromise was reached with Hungarians in 1867 which led to the establishment of the Dual Monarchy. Native history and culture were rediscovered and appropriated for the national struggle. Following a conflict between Russia and Turkey, the Great Powers met at Berlin in 1878 and granted independence to Romania, Serbia and Montenegro and limited autonomy to Bulgaria.

Nationalism's growth and export 

The invention of a symbolic national identity became the concern of racial, ethnic or linguistic groups throughout Europe as they struggled to come to terms with the rise of mass politics, the decline of the traditional social elites, popular discrimination and xenophobia. Within the Habsburg monarchy the different peoples developed a more mass-based, radical and exclusive form of nationalism. This developed even among the Germans and Magyars, who actually benefited from the power-structure of the empire. On the European periphery, especially in Ireland and Norway, campaigns for national independence became more strident. In 1905, Norway won independence from Sweden, but attempts to grant Ireland a kind of autonomy foundered on the national divisions on the island between the Catholic and Protestant populations. The Polish attempts to win independence from Russia had previously proved to be unsuccessful, with Poland being the only country in Europe whose autonomy was gradually limited rather than expanded throughout the 19th century, as a punishment for the failed uprisings; in 1831 Poland lost its status as a formally independent state and was merged into Russia as a real union country and in 1867 she became nothing more than just another Russian province. Faced with internal and external resistance to assimilation, as well as increased xenophobic anti-Semitism, radical demands began to develop among the stateless Jewish population of eastern and central Europe for their own national home and refuge. In 1897, inspired by the Hungarian-born Jewish nationalist Theodor Herzl, the First Zionist Congress was held in Basle, and declared their national 'home' should be in Palestine. By the end of the period, the ideals of European nationalism had been exported worldwide and were now beginning to develop, and both compete and threaten the empires ruled by colonial European nation-states.

Now, within the modern era, nationalism continues to rise in Europe, but in the form of anti-globalization. In a study recently conducted, researchers found that Chinese import shock from globalization leads to uneven adjustment costs being spread across regions of Europe. In response, there has been an increase in support for nationalist and radical-right wing parties in Europe that promote anti-globalist policies.

Revolutionary organizations 
Serb revolutionary organizations
Greek revolutionary organizations
Albanian revolutionary organizations
Internal Macedonian Revolutionary Organization

References

See also 

 Communitarianism
 Cultural identity
 Expansionism
 Identity politics
 Intercultural competence
 Irish nationalism
 National flag
 National liberation movements
 National personification
 National romanticism
 Society of the United Irishmen
 Nation state

1848 establishments in Europe
 
Political theories
History of Europe
French Revolution
Nationalism In Europe